The Treasure of Alpheus Winterborn is a mystery novel directed at child readers. It was written by John Bellairs and originally published in 1978. The book was illustrated by Judith Gwyn Brown. Adapted for television in 1980.

Plot summary
Anthony Monday and his family live in Hoosac, Minnesota, in the 1950s and, while not poor, are having financial difficulties. To make matters worse, Anthony's father suffers a series of heart-attacks, keeping him from working and further straining the family's resources. Anthony is desperate to help with expenses and accepts a part-time job from Myra Eells, the elderly librarian of Hoosac Public Library. Working at the library allows Anthony to earn a little money, as well learn more about Alpheus Winterborn, the wealthy and eccentric man who built the library.

Rumor has it that Winterborn found something on an archeological dig many years before and hid it for safekeeping in the library, but no one believes the tale to be true. During his chores around the building, Anthony ultimately finds a clue hinting that the treasure does exist and, if clues written by Winterborn himself are followed correctly, they will lead the one to the prize. Anthony knows that finding the treasure will result in money that can help with family finances. But soon Anthony runs afoul of the greedy bank vice-president, Hugo Philpotts, a descendant of the Winterborn family. The two commence dueling searches for the treasure.

Eventually, during a fierce storm, Anthony finds the treasure: A golden statue worth hundreds of thousands of dollars. He sells the statue, giving half of the money to Ms. Eells and keeping half for himself.

External links
Discussion of The Treasure of Alpheus Winterborn at www.bellairsia.com

1978 American novels
American fantasy novels
American mystery novels
Novels set in Minnesota